The Money Corral is a 1919 American silent adventure film directed by Lambert Hillyer and written by William S. Hart and Lambert Hillyer. The film stars William S. Hart, Jane Novak, Herschel Mayall, Winter Hall, Rhea Mitchell, and Patricia Palmer. The film was released on April 20, 1919, by Paramount Pictures. It is not known whether the film currently survives, and it may be a lost film.

Plot

As described in a film magazine, following his performance at a Montana rodeo, cowboy Lem Beason (Hart) accepts the invitation of Chicago banker Gregory Collins (Hall) to come to the city and take a position of watchman at the bank, recent robberies having resulted in the death of the last two watchmen. Carl Bruner (Mayall), Collins' trusted lieutenant, is the instigator of the thefts and sends Beason to the underworld on a false clue, planning his quiet murder. However, Beason comes out unscathed and convinced of Bruner's duplicity. Collins's petted daughter Janet (Mitchell) parades the westerner for the benefit of a gay house party, and Rose (Novak), a poor relation, aids Beason in his escape. He resigns his bank job, but stays in town one more night, knowing that there will be another attempted theft at the bank. He captures Bruner and his aides and exposes them to Collins. Collins buys Beason a ranch in the west and he convinces Rose to share it with him.

Cast
William S. Hart as Lem Beason
Jane Novak as Rose
Herschel Mayall as Carl Bruner
Winter Hall as Gregory Collins
Rhea Mitchell as Janet Collins
Patricia Palmer as Chicago Kate

References

External links 

 
 

1919 films
American adventure films
1919 adventure films
Paramount Pictures films
Films directed by Lambert Hillyer
American black-and-white films
American silent feature films
1910s English-language films
1910s American films
Silent adventure films